My Chartreuse Opinion is a 1989 solo album by Scott McCaughey, later reissued as an album by The Minus 5 on Hollywood Records on August 26, 1997.

Critical reception

The editorial staff of AllMusic Guide gave the album three out of five stars, with reviewer Tim DiGravina calling it "an endearing album that could get by on charm alone" and a "joyful, minor album of songs that are just a step away from being gems".

Track listing
All songs written by McCaughey, unless otherwise noted:
"Losing Battle" – 3:04
"Happy for the Box" – 2:03
"The Big Dead End" – 2:08
"A Sobering Thought" – 3:28
"Real True Tragedy Incident" – 2:55
"You'll Never See My Face Again" (Barry Gibb, Maurice Gibb, and Robin Gibb) – 4:21
"I Might Have Listened" – 1:56
"Evolution" – 2:45
"Shut Them Out" – 2:26
"Big Deal" – 2:45
"The Real Prime Directive" – 3:02
"People Say" (Jeff Barry and Ellie Greenwich) – 2:42

East Side Digital and Hollywood Records bonus tracks
"Sittin' Round Doin' Nothin'" (Tad Hutchison and McCaughey) – 2:44
"Roller Coaster Blues" – 2:52

Jimmy Silva Hits from the East Side Digital release
"Fair Exchange" (Jimmy Silva)– 2:47
"Waking Up" (Silva)– 3:23
"Party Town U.S.A." (Silva)– 3:01
"Lathe" (Silva)– 7:00

Personnel
Jim Babjack – lead guitar on "Real True Tragedy Incident"
Chuck Carroll – lead guitar on "Shut Them Out"
Jed Critter – musical saw on "A Sobering Thought", slide guitar  on "You'll Never See My Face Again"
Dennis Diken – drums
Eric Erickson – slide mini guitar on "A Sobering Thought"
Riki Mafune – backing vocals on "People Say"
Scott McCaughey – vocals, guitar, bass guitar, organ, piano, vibes, mandolin on "The Real Prime Directive", production
Christy McWilson – harmony vocals on "Happy for the Box", backing vocals on "People Say"
Brent Pennington – slide guitar on "Shut Them Out", lead guitar on "The Real Prime Directive"
Blackie Rad – percussion on "A Sobering Thought"
Jim Sangster – lead guitar on "Losing Battle"
Jimmy Silva – twelve-string guitar on "You'll Never See My Face Again"
Conrad Uno – production

Re-release bonus tracks
Ben Vaughn Combo on "Sittin' Round Doin' Nothin'" and "Roller Coaster Blues":
Aldo Jones – piano, vocals
Robbie Robinson – snare drum, vocals
Conrad Uno – vocals
Ben Vaughn – organ
Mike Vogelman – bass guitar, vocals
Scott McCaughey – vocals, guitar, production

References

External links

My Chartreuse Opinion at Rate Your Music

1989 albums
Hollywood Records albums
Scott McCaughey albums
The Minus 5 albums
Albums produced by Conrad Uno
PopLlama Records albums
East Side Digital Records albums